Just Bakery of Atlanta is a nonprofit bakery that partners with neighbors who resettled as refugees on paid job training, professional certification, and living wage work.

The bakery was founded in October 2017 by Leah Lonsbury. Just Bakery of Atlanta bakes in a commercial kitchen in Stone Mountain, sells for doorstep deliveries and neighborhood pick-ups through an online store, and pop-ups up around the metro area, including at the Oakhurst Farmers Market on Saturdays from 9am-1pm.

References

Further reading

External links 

 Official website

Bakeries of the United States
Food and drink companies based in Atlanta
Manufacturing companies based in Atlanta
Non-profit organizations based in Georgia (U.S. state)
Refugee aid organizations in the United States